Cyrtopodium andersonii is a species of orchid. It is native to South America (Brazil, Venezuela, Colombia and the Guianas). It is the type species of the genus Cyrtopodium.

References

External links 

andersonii
Orchids of South America
Taxa named by Robert Brown (botanist, born 1773)
Taxa named by Henry Cranke Andrews